Kolho is a village in the city-municipality of Mänttä-Vilppula in Finland.

During the Finnish Civil War, in winter 1918, the Finnish air force used Kolho as a base. Kolho has influenced a number of Finnish artists ranging from Eero Järnefelt, Akseli Gallen-Kallela to Pentti Saarikoski and also was the site of the worst church boat accident in Finnish history.  Kolho played a role in the rise of the Finnish paper industry together with the neighbouring Mänttä community. More recently Kolho is known for its natural environment and is a summer resort destination.

James Vehko (aka Jalmari Vehkomäki), the designer of the first Ford's metallic automobile chassis, was originally from Kolho.

External links
 
 Kolho 

Villages in Finland
Mänttä-Vilppula

fi:Vilppula